The Golden Lily is a 2012 urban fantasy young adult novel by New York Times bestselling author Richelle Mead and is the second novel of the Bloodlines series. The book follows several teenaged students as they deal with forbidden romances, the Strigoi, and the supernatural in general.

Summary
The book follows Sydney Sage, a young Alchemist that is forced to hide inside a ritzy boarding school in Palm Springs, California so that she can protect Jillian (Jill) Dragomir, a Moroi princess. The Alchemists are one of a group of humans who dabble in magic and serve to bridge the worlds of humans and vampires. They protect vampire secrets—and human lives.

There are those who want Jill dead by an assassin's hand in order to provoke a civil war within the Moroi court, and to take Jill's sister Moroi Queen, Lissa off of her throne. The assignment provides Sydney a way to redeem herself from previous disgrace due to helping a Dhampir who was falsely accused of murder, Rose Hathaway, who was also Lissa's best friend. But her close proximity with Jill, the Dhampir Eddie, and the Moroi Spirit user Adrian, cause her to question everything she thought she knew about herself, Alchemists, and the world in general.

During all of this, Sydney finds herself also questioning her relationship with Brayden, someone who is seemingly perfect for her in every way. Even as she cares for him, Sydney finds her attentions also being drawn to someone that she can never be allowed to be with, Adrian. As secrets come to light and loyalties are given a trial by fire, Sydney has to find a way to make it through all of this with herself and all that she cares for intact.

Reception
Reviews for The Golden Lily were generally positive, receiving four stars from RT Book Reviews.

Characters
 Sydney Sage
 Adrian Ivashkov
 Jill Mastrano
 Eddie Castile - A dhampir, who secretly loves Jill 
 Dimitri Belikov – a former Strigoi, Christian's Guardian and Rose's boyfriend 
 Angeline Dawes – a Keeper dhampir and Jill's roommate, responsible for her protection
 Jacqueline Terwilliger – Sydney's history teacher and a witch

References

External links

 Vampire Academy Series
 Razorbill Books' official Bloodlines site

2012 American novels
2012 fantasy novels
American young adult novels
American fantasy novels
American vampire novels
Novels set in Palm Springs, California
Vampire Academy series
Novels by Richelle Mead
Razorbill books